The 1978 Idaho Vandals football team represented the University of Idaho in the 1978 NCAA Division I-AA football season. The Vandals were led by new head coach Jerry Davitch and were members of the Big Sky Conference. They played their home games at the Kibbie Dome, an indoor facility on campus in Moscow, Idaho. Davitch was previously an assistant at the Air Force Academy for five seasons under longtime head coach Ben Martin, preceded by four years as a high school head coach in Tucson, Arizona.

With sophomore quarterbacks Jay Goodenbour and Mike McCurdy running the veer offense, the Vandals were 2–9 overall and 2–4 in the Big Sky in 1978. Projected starter Rocky Tuttle injured an ankle in the final scrimmage, had tendon surgery, and redshirted; as a fifth-year senior in 1979, he started as a running back and receiver.

Flying from Pocatello to the Palouse on the afternoon of the game because of unavailable lodging, one of ISU's two chartered Convair 440 aircraft had carburetor problems soon after takeoff and had to land. It carried the defensive players; the other with the offense landed safely at the Moscow-Pullman airport two hours later. After difficulties in arranging a viable makeup date, a forfeit win was awarded to the Vandals. It was the conference finale for both teams, and Idaho State finished winless in the Big Sky.

This was the first season for the newly created Division I-AA, which the Big Sky joined. It was previously a Division II conference for football, except for Division I member Idaho, which moved down to I-AA this season. Idaho had maintained its upper division status in the NCAA by playing Division I non-conference opponents.

Schedule

Roster

All-conference
No Vandals were chosen for All-Big Sky first team, but seven were selected for the second team; the two picks on offense were tackle Kyle Riddell and center Larry Coombs. The five on the defense were linebacker Brian Rekofke, defensive linemen Mark McNeal and Steve Parker, and defensive backs Rick Linehan

NFL Draft
No Vandals were selected in the 1979 NFL Draft, which lasted twelve rounds (330 selections).

One Vandal junior was later selected in the 1980 NFL Draft, also twelve rounds (333 selections).

List of Idaho Vandals in the NFL Draft

References

External links
Gem of the Mountains: 1979 University of Idaho yearbook – 1978 football season
Idaho Argonaut – student newspaper – 1978 editions
Game program: Idaho at Washington State – September 16, 1978

Idaho
Idaho Vandals football seasons
Idaho Vandals football